Linton Vassell (born 3 June 1983) is an English mixed martial artist, who competes in the Heavyweight division of Bellator. A professional since 2008, he has also competed for UCMMA and Cage Warriors. He is the former UCMMA Light Heavyweight Champion. As of March 14, 2023, he is #1 in the Bellator Heavyweight Rankings.

Mixed martial arts career

Early career
Vassell started training in mixed martial arts at the age of 23 in 2007 in Milton Keynes. After training for six months he won his first amateur fight against opponent Ian Tobell in October 2007, three weeks later he was fighting for the AMMA Championship Title against Danny Hudson, a fight he won by submission.

Vassell fought Stav Economou to a decision loss for the vacant UWC Heavyweight Championship.

After winning his next fight, he went to Cage Warriors where he meet Simon Carlsen, he defeated Carlsen by decision at Cage Warriors 41.

After winning two fights on UCMMA he went on to win the UCMMA Light Heavyweight Championship.

UCMMA Light Heavyweight Championship reign
On 4 February 2012, Vassell defeated Aurelijus Kerpe to become the new UCMMA Light Heavyweight Champion which was made vacant after Jimi Manuwa signed to BAMMA.

He successfully defended his title for the first time when he defeated Nick Chapman by submission early into the second round.

Linton Vassell fought Zelg Galesic for UCMMA Light Heavyweight Championship on 2 February 2013. Zelg opened the fight with impressive striking, but Vassell moved the fight on the ground where he dominated Galesic and won the fight by first-round TKO to retain the UCMMA Light Heavyweight Championship.

BAMMA
Vassell was scheduled to face Jason Jones at BAMMA 11, but had to pull out due to injury.

Bellator MMA
On 7 August 2013 Bellator announced that Vassell has signed a contract with the promotion. He made his debut against Matt Jones on 8 November 2013 at Bellator 107. Vassell won the fight via unanimous decision.

Vassell returned to the Bellator cage on 28 March 2014 at Bellator 114, he faced Trevor Carlson. Vassell won via rear-naked choke submission in the second round.

In his next appearance for Bellator, Vassell faced Virgil Zwicker at Bellator 122 on 25 July 2014. Vassell won via submission in the first round.

Vassell challenged Emanuel Newton for his light heavyweight title at Bellator 130 on 24 October 2014. Despite winning the first two rounds of the fight due to a dominant ground game, Vassell lost the fight via submission in the fifth round.

Vassell faced UFC and PRIDE veteran Sokoudjou on 27 February 2015 at Bellator 134. He won the fight by TKO in the second round.

Vassell was next a participant in Bellator's one-night Light Heavyweight tournament at Bellator MMA & Glory: Dynamite 1 on 19 September 2015.  He faced Muhammed Lawal in the opening round and lost via unanimous decision.

Vassell had a rematch with Emanuel Newton on 19 February 2016 at Bellator 149. He won the fight via unanimous decision.

Vassell was supposed to fight Francis Carmont at Bellator 158 but a cut over his left eye forced him to withdraw. The bout was re-booked for Bellator 165 on 19 November 2016. He won the fight by unanimous decision.

Vassell faced Liam McGeary at Bellator 179 on 19 May 2017. He won the fight via arm-triangle choke submission in the third round and, thus, becoming the first fighter to finish McGeary.

After a three-fight winning streak, Vassell faced newly crowned light heavyweight champion, Ryan Bader, at Bellator 186 on 3 November 2017. He lost the fight via TKO in the second round.

Vassell faced Phil Davis on 25 May 2018 at Bellator 200. He lost the fight via knock out due to a head kick in round three.

Vassell faced Valentin Moldavsky on March 22, 2019 at Bellator 218, where he lost by unanimous decision.

Vassell headlined Bellator 234 against Sergei Kharitonov on 14 November 2019. He won the fight via TKO in the second round.

Vassell faced Ronny Markes at Bellator 254 on 10 December 2020. He won the fight via TKO in the second round.

Vassell was expected to face Marcelo Golm on July 16, 2021 at Bellator 262. On July 12, the bout was scratched after Vassell suffered an injury.

Vassell faced Tyrell Fortune on November 12, 2021 at Bellator 271. In a highly competitive affair, Vassell won the bout via split decision. 5 out of 6 media scores gave it to Vassell.\

Vassell faced Timothy Johnson on April 15, 2022 at Bellator 277. After getting rocked early, Vassell completed the comeback and won the bout via TKO at the end of the first.

After the victory, Vassell signed a new 6 bout deal.

Vassell rematched Valentin Moldavsky on March 10, 2023 at Bellator 292. He won the bout in the first round, dropping Moldavsky and knocking him out with elbows from mount.

Championships and Accomplishments
Olympian MMA Championships
OMMAC British Light Heavyweight Championship (One Time)
Ultimate Challenge MMA
UCMMA Light Heavyweight Championship (One Time)

Mixed martial arts record

|-
|Win
|align=center|23–8 (1)
|Valentin Moldavsky
|KO (punches and elbows)
|Bellator 292
|
|align=center|1
|align=center|3:03
|San Jose, California, United States
|
|-
|Win
|align=center|22–8 (1)
|Timothy Johnson
|TKO (punches)
|Bellator 277
|
|align=center|1
|align=center|4:21
|San Jose, California, United States
|
|-
| Win
| align=center|21–8 (1)
| Tyrell Fortune
| Decision (split)
| Bellator 271
|
| align=center| 3
| align=center| 5:00
| Hollywood, Florida, United States
|
|-
|Win
|align=center|
|Ronny Markes
|TKO (punches)
|Bellator 254
|
|align=center|2
|align=center|3:37
|Uncasville, Connecticut, United States
|
|-
| Win
| align=center| 19–8 (1)
| Sergei Kharitonov 
| TKO (punches)
| Bellator 234
| 
| align=center| 2
| align=center| 3:15
| Tel Aviv, Israel
|
|-
| Loss
| align=center| 18–8 (1)
| Valentin Moldavsky
| Decision (unanimous)
| Bellator 218
| 
| align=center| 3
| align=center| 5:00
| Thackerville, Oklahoma, United States
|  
|-
|Loss
|align=center| 18–7 (1)
|Phil Davis
|KO (head kick)
|Bellator 200
|
|align=center|3
|align=center|1:05
|London, England
|
|-
|Loss
|align=center| 18–6 (1)
|Ryan Bader
|TKO (punches)
|Bellator 186
|
|align=center|2
|align=center|3:58
|University Park, Pennsylvania, United States
|
|-
|Win
|align=center| 18–5 (1)
|Liam McGeary
| Submission (arm-triangle choke)	
|Bellator 179
|
|align=center|3
|align=center|2:28
|London, England
|
|-
|Win
|align=center| 17–5 (1)
|Francis Carmont
| Decision (unanimous)
|Bellator 165
|
|align=center|3
|align=center|5:00
|San Jose, California, United States
|
|-
|Win
|align=center| 16–5 (1)
|Emanuel Newton
|Decision (unanimous)
| Bellator 149
|
|align=center|3
|align=center|5:00
|Houston, Texas, United States
|
|-
| Loss
| align=center| 15–5 (1)
| Muhammed Lawal
| Decision (unanimous)
| Bellator 142: Dynamite 1
| 
| align=center| 2
| align=center| 5:00
| San Jose, California, United States
| 
|-
| Win
| align=center| 15–4 (1)
| Rameau Thierry Sokoudjou
| TKO (punches)
| Bellator 134
| 
| align=center| 2
| align=center| 3:18
| Uncasville, Connecticut, United States
| 
|-
| Loss
| align=center| 14–4 (1)
| Emanuel Newton
| Submission (rear-naked choke)
| Bellator 130
| 
| align=center| 5
| align=center| 0:47
| Mulvane, Kansas, United States
| <small> For the Bellator Light Heavyweight World Championship
|-
| Win
| align=center| 14–3 (1)
| Virgil Zwicker
| Submission (rear-naked choke)
| Bellator 122
| 
| align=center| 1
| align=center| 1:07
| Temecula, California, United States
| 
|-
| Win
| align=center| 13–3 (1)
| Trevor Carlson
| Submission (rear-naked choke)
| Bellator 114
| 
| align=center| 2
| align=center| 1:54
| Salt Lake City, Utah, United States
| 
|-
| Win
| align=center| 12–3 (1)
| Matt Jones
| Decision (unanimous)
| Bellator 107
| 
| align=center| 3
| align=center| 5:00
| Thackerville, Oklahoma, United States
| 
|-
| Win
| align=center| 11–3 (1)
| Zelg Galešic
| TKO (punches)
| UCMMA 32
| 
| align=center| 1
| align=center| 4:31
| England
| Defended UCMMA Light Heavyweight Championship.
|-
| Win
| align=center| 10–3 (1)
| Nick Chapman
| Submission (rear-naked choke)
| UCMMA 29
| 
| align=center| 2
| align=center| 0:55
| London, England
| Defended UCMMA Light Heavyweight Championship.
|-
| Win
| align=center| 9–3 (1)
| Aurelijus Kerpe
| Submission (armbar)
| UCMMA 26: The Real Deal
| 
| align=center| 1
| align=center| 3:16
| London, England
| Won UCMMA Light Heavyweight Championship.
|-
| Win
| align=center| 8–3 (1)
| Zsolt Balla
| TKO (punches)
| UWC 17: Bad to the Bone
| 
| align=center| 1
| align=center| 2:09
| Essex, England
| 
|-
| Win
| align=center| 7–3 (1)
| Simon Carlsen
| Decision (unanimous)
| Cage Warriors: 41
| 
| align=center| 3
| align=center| 5:00
| London, England
| 
|-
| Win
| align=center| 6–3 (1)
| Rolandas Cizauskas
| TKO (punches)
| UCMMA 18: Face Off
| 
| align=center| 1
| align=center| 4:21
| London, England
| 
|-
| Loss
| align=center| 5–3 (1)
| Matti Mäkelä
| TKO (punches)
| SC 6: Lion's Den
| 
| align=center| 3
| align=center| 4:10
| Stockholm, Sweden
| 
|-
| NC
| align=center| 5–2 (1)
| Adrian Preda
| No Contest
| UCMMA 16: Unbelievable
| 
| align=center| 1
| align=center| N/A
| London, England
| 
|-
| Win
| align=center| 5–2
| Kevin Thompson
| Submission (rear-naked choke)
| OMMAC 5: Showdown
| 
| align=center| 1
| align=center| 4:21
| Liverpool, England
| 
|-
| Win
| align=center| 4–2
| Nick Nembherd
| TKO (punches)
| UWC 12: Revolution
| 
| align=center| 1
| align=center| 2:49
| Essex, England
| 
|-
| Loss
| align=center| 3–2
| Stav Economou
| Decision (unanimous)
| UWC 11: Onslaught
| 
| align=center| 3
| align=center| 5:00
| Essex, England
| 
|-
| Win
| align=center| 3–1
| Svajunas Siacuila
| Submission (americana)
| UWC 10
| 
| align=center| 1
| align=center| 0:48
| Essex, England
| 
|-
| Win
| align=center| 2–1
| Reza Mahdavian
| TKO (punches)
| UWC 9
| 
| align=center| 1
| align=center| 2:35
| Essex, England
| 
|-
| Loss
| align=center| 1–1
| Shola Adeniran
| TKO (punches)
| UWC 8: Vendetta
| 
| align=center| 3
| align=center| 3:43
| Essex, England
| 
|-
| Win
| align=center| 1–0
| Chris Greig	
| Submission (rear-naked choke)
| FX3: Fight Night 9
| 
| align=center| 1
| align=center| 3:19
| Reading, England
| 
|-

See also
 List of current Bellator fighters
 List of male mixed martial artists
 Smoking Rocket design new Official website for Linton Vassell

References

External links
 

Living people
Black British sportspeople
English male mixed martial artists
Light heavyweight mixed martial artists
1983 births